Molurina is a subtribe of darkling beetles in the family Tenebrionidae. There are 28 genera and 579 described species and subspecies in subtribe Molurina. The type genus for this subtribe is Moluris. These beetles are widely distributed through the Afrotropics, with the exception of western Africa.

Genera
These 28 genera belong to the subtribe Molurina:

 Amiantus 
 Argenticrinis 
 Arturium 
 Bombocnodulus 
 Brachyphrynus 
 Chiliarchum 
 Dichtha 
 Distretus 
 Euphrynus 
 Glyptophrynus 
 Huilamus 
 Mariazofia 
 Melanolophus 
 Moluris 
 Ocnodes 
 Piesomera 
 Phrynocolus 
 Phrynophanes 
 Physophrynus 
 Psammodes 
 Psammophanes 
 Psammorhyssus 
 Psammotyria 
 Stridulomus 
 Tarsocnodes 
 Toktokkus 
 Tibiocnodes 
 Tuberocnodes

References

Tenebrionidae